Nigeria Maritime University, founded in 2012, Nigerian Maritime University, Okerenkoko is a non-profit public higher education institution located in Okerenkoko, Gbaramatu Kingdom Delta state. Officially recognized by the National Universities Commission of Nigeria, Nigerian Maritime University, Okerenkoko (NMU) is a coeducational Nigerian higher education institution. Nigerian Maritime University, Okerenkoko (NMU) offers courses and programs leading to officially recognized higher education degrees such as bachelor degrees in several areas of study. The university has a regimentation unit with its first Chief Cadet Captain and Cadet Adjutant, Emperor D.O. Alagoa.

Nigeriaia Maritime University is the first military university and maritime college in Nigeria and West Africa. In February 2018 NUC (Nigerian University Commission) gave approval to commence degree program in the University.

The Nigeria Maritime University has a regimental unit, composed of a Regimental  Director, a Chief Cadet Captain, (Emperor D.O. Alagoa)etc.

Proposed Shutdown 
In 2021, there were rumour that the institution was shutdown for non payment of salary and poor welfare. The report was however dismissed by the registrar of the institution, Dr Alfred Mulade. The registrar described the information as fake news and reaffirmed that the school is open for academic activities

References

External links

Maritime colleges
Education in Delta State
Universities and colleges in Nigeria
2012 establishments in Nigeria
Educational institutions established in 2012